Marie-Louise Arsenault is a Canadian radio personality, who hosts the literary talk show Plus on est de fous, plus on lit ! on Ici Radio-Canada Première. In this role, she was also the moderator of the final three editions of Le Combat des livres.

A longtime arts journalist for Radio-Canada, she also previously hosted the radio programs Jamais sans mon livre and On aura tout lu, as well as the television series Écran libre for Télé-Québec, Génération T for TVA and Flash for TQS.

References

Canadian talk radio hosts
Canadian television hosts
Canadian women television hosts
Canadian women radio hosts
CBC Radio hosts
French Quebecers
People from Chibougamau
Living people
Year of birth missing (living people)